Democratic backsliding in Ethiopia is ongoing, most notably under the administration of Prime Minister Abiy Ahmed. Since assumption of power in April 2018, Ahmed has played crucial role of reforms in the Ethiopian politics and reversal of policies implemented by the former ruling party, the Ethiopian People's Revolutionary Democratic Front (EPRDF). Abiy immediately gained public approval and international recognition owing to liberalized policymaking including in media outlets, gender equality, internet freedom and privatization of economy. Furtherly, he was also warmly gained accolades for ending 20-years conflict between Ethiopia and Eritrea, from which he awarded the 2019 Nobel Peace Prize, being the first Ethiopian to earn the title. Thus, by 2019, Ethiopia was topped in 19 position out of 100 in Freedom in the World chart, signalized significant improvement from the past decades.
In December 2019, he formed the Prosperity Party by dissolution of EPRDF and merged all its ethnic based regional parties while the Tigray People's Liberation Front (TPLF) refused to obey, resulting intense face-off with the federal government. He promised to hold free and fair upcoming election; although due to COVID-19 pandemic deterioration and other security and logistics issues, the election was postponed indefinitely in mid-2020. Opponents called this action as backdrop to "reconsolidate dictatorship" and "constitutional crisis". On 9 September 2020, the Tigray Regional election were held as the federal government deemed illegal election. According to the electoral commission, the TPLF won 98.2% of 152 seats were contested. The federal government and the Tigray authority relations aggravated by late 2020, culminating the Tigray War.

Domestically, democracy was seen eroded since the raise of armed conflicts in the country. Abiy government declined to execute public order and political persecution sporadically appeared by 2021. As of June 2022, 18 journalists and dissents were jailed in alleged disseminating misinformation to "undermine his government". By 2021, 46 journalists were jailed, making Ethiopia the worst jailers in Africa, with many subjected to forced disappearance.

2018–2019 
Short after assumption as Prime Minister in 2018, Abiy Ahmed overwhelmingly praised by international community and gained unprecedented support by Ethiopians and diaspora community for democratic reforms including releasing political prisoners mostly journalists imprisoned by former ruling party, the EPRDF, encouraging gender equality in his cabinet, liberalizing banned media outlets and internet censorship, and lifted state of emergency imposed in October 2016 in June 2018. Some argued that Abiy would resolve public discontents of the government by bringing political changes that fulfill democracy and freedom of people. The Parliament accepted female nominees including the first female President Sahle-Work Zewde in the Federal Supreme Court, and Abiy requested the dissents of the former ruling party to return from the United States in order to run an electoral commission. Freedom in the World report by Freedom of House compared Ethiopia's ascension of political rights and civil liberties to Malaysia rose 12 to 19, while Malaysia rose 45 to 52.

For his effort to settle 20-years conflict between Ethiopia and Eritrea and among "increasing women's rights", Abiy was awarded the 2019 Nobel Peace Prize. The Nobel Committee's announced Abiy's reform "efforts to achieve peace and international cooperation," including his "reforms that give many citizens hope for a better life and a brighter future."  Abiy used "Medemer" rhetoric which means "summing" to refer political centralization in favor of Ethiopian nationalism and breakup of ethnic federalism that permeated since 1990s rule of former ruling party. Hence, he published the first book of the same name in October 2019. Abiy described by his words "Medemer, an Amharic word, signifies synergy, convergence and teamwork for a common destiny. […] In essence, Medemer is an act of peace that seeks the unity of our common humanity." 

In November 2019, Abiy dissolved EPRDF and merged all ethnically based regional parties to form his Prosperity Party in December 2019. The Afar, Somali, Oromia, Benishangul-Gumuz, Harari, Gambela and the Southern Nations, Nationalities, and People's regional parties were merged to the Prosperity Party while the Tigray People's Liberation Front (TPLF) only refused to merge and is the main opponent of Abiy's government. He promised that the party would promote liberal democracy and give opportunity for private sector. The Prosperity Party was criticized by Somali Regional government to TPLF cause. On 14 August 2021, former Vice President of the Somali Region, Abdifatah Mohamoud was detained by unidentified security officers in Addis Ababa and sent him to Jijiga, where arbitrary detained and released that day. According to him, the detention was enforced by Somali Region President Mustafa Mohammed Omer assisted by the National Intelligence and Security Service (NISS). This fueled an opposition to the party and the installation of Mustafa in president had caused Somali political instability.

2020–present 
Abiy pledged to hold free and fair election in May 2020, but due to logistic and security concerns, the election postponed indefinitely with many opposition parties and some critics called it "constitutional crisis".  The National Election Board of Ethiopia (NEBE) announced on 31 March that the election was postponed as a result of COVID-19 pandemic and were unable to organize the polls on time which scheduled the date on 29 August. Opponent called the postponement as a backdrop of "reconsolidate dictatorship". The board chairperson Birtukan Mideksa announced in mid April that only half of 50,000 polling stations were operational except for Afar and Somali Region, which haven't functional stations at all. On 9 September 2020 election of Tigray Region, the Tigray regional government did not recognize Abiy's national election which he deemed "illegal", and believed his condemnation was "meaningless" and his constitutional term would terminated in October 2020.

According the head of Tigray Region electoral commission, Muluwork Kidanemariam, the vote was conducted without further violence or complaints and people were rejoiced and peaceful with over 97% turnout. In an interview with state media, Abiy's dismissed the election as "no legal basis" and are "null and void" and called it "shanty election". In response, the Tigrayan authorities accused Abiy's federal government of breaching self-rule rights granted under Article 39 of the Constitution while the federal government asserted constitutional mandate for political rights to conduct election under Article 55.

On 21 June 2021, parliamentary and regional elections were held under the country's unrest as well as the condition of COVID-19 pandemic. Observers such as the African Union, the Eastern Africa Standby Force and necessarily the local Ethiopian civil societies did not informed the cases. The election were held in 436 parliamentary constituencies out of 547 with those 111 constituencies expected to held on 6 September including Benishangul-Gumuz, some parts of Western Oromia, Somali and Harari Region, and several zones in the Southern Nations, Nationalities, and People's Region due to irregularities and affected by fault in ballot paper. The election was deemed a democratic improvement since past elections while NEBE faced considerable logistical challenges. The Property Party landslide won 410 seats out of 436 in the federal parliament, exceeding his term into five years.

2022 purges
Abiy's government was accused of purge of opposition groups, as of June 2022, 18 journalists, YouTubers and members of Fano movement were jailed, 4,500 people were arrested in Amhara Region. The Amhara Region Prosperity Party alleged that the some of its members were suspended due to implementing long-term loan to assist their leaders and employees by negotiating with financial institution.

Press freedom 

In 2019 World Press Freedom Index complied by Reporters Without Borders, Ethiopia's press freedom was improved significantly lowering from 150 to 110 out of 180 countries. Addis Ababa based journalists Berihun Adane who published to mentor at Berera newspaper told "This paper exists because of Abiy's reforms. But now we are witnessing the same thing that has happened after every regime change: first there are lots of new magazines and newspapers, then the government starts to crack down on them." Activist Jawar Mohammed accused Abiy Ahmed of increasing "authoritarianism" following claimed house invasion by security forces in his building resulting the October 2019 protest in Addis Ababa.

Since the start of the Tigray War, Ethiopia's freedom of press downgraded by rank. In 2021, 46 journalists were detained which makes Ethiopia the worst jailers in Africa. On 3 May 2022, the state funded Ethiopian Human Rights Commission (EHRC) released a statement of journalist Gobeze Sisay whereabout after plainclothes officers arrested him on 1 May. 

Press watchdogs and human rights groups actively describing Abiy's government "increasingly intimidating" the media as well as harassing opponents to propel unrest in regions and demanded to release 16 journalists and media personnels after the new wave of arrest in Addis Ababa. Tamerat Negera, the founder and managing director of online media, Terara Network has been arrested on 10 December 2021 in alleged dissemination of false information; the federal government took the November 2021 state of emergency as advantage to detain him without trials and charges. He also accused for "commiting a variety of offense" though without collected evidence so far, and numerous charges were opened that took 100 days. On 10 March 2022,  the Oromia Supreme Court ordered the prosecutors of Oromia Attorney to extra charges Tamerat for 15 days if reasonable indict is available. The judges transferred him to Sabata Daliti police station in the Oromia Special Zone. He was released on 5 April 2022 with bail of 50,000 ETB.

Freedom of religion
The Abiy's administration was noted for religious intolerance and persecution; commonly due to doctrinal and political dominance in the country. The Meskel Square controversy occurred when the Addis Ababa City Administration, without consent, took ownership over the square. Since 2020, the government planned to build vegetable and fruit market under guise of COVID-19 pandemic, which could affect the property of the Church. Under mayor ship of Adanech Abebe, the square ownership was disputed between the Orthodox and Protestant followers. Adanech claimed that the square was built by taxpayers from Addis Ababa residents. The Ethiopian Orthodox said that it would provide document for ownership, which was a "faithful individual who passed it on to the Ethiopian Church before several decade ago". In early 2022, the Ethiopian Orthodox and Protestant Christians clashed over Meskel Square, while the Church condemning the Addis Ababa City administration decision, which states the square should be used for secular purpose, and banned any religious celebration other than the Church. 

After the Ethiopian Orthodox banned illegally ordained Archbishops who were formed on 22 January 2023, there were sporadic violences against Orthodox Christians, particularly since the beginning of February. On 4 February, clashes erupted between the government force and people in West Arsi Zone and Shashamene when Abune Paulos who was appointed as "Holy Synod of Oromia and Nations and Nationalities" in the West Arsi Zone traveled to Shashamene, which killed three people. The Church appealed to organize peaceful demonstration but the Ethiopian Joint Security and Intelligence Task Force restricted the demonstration, citing to deliberately “create unrest” among the faithful.

Ethnic violence examples

See also
 Amhara genocide
 Ethnic violence in Konso
 Ethnic violence against Amaro Koore
 Galicoma massacre
 Gambela massacre

References

Human rights in Ethiopia
 Politics of Ethiopia
Ethiopian civil conflict (2018–present)
2018 in Ethiopia
2019 in Ethiopia
2020 in Ethiopia
2021 in Ethiopia
2022 in Ethiopia
Democratic backsliding